American Pacific Whaling Company was a 20th century whaling company. The fleet worked the North Pacific and wintered in Meydenbauer Bay on Lake Washington, now part of Bellevue, Washington. The company was founded in Seattle  1911 and possibly renamed to North Pacific Sea Products when subsumed by  Consolidated Whaling Company with Canadian ownership in 1918. In 1919, the company moved its headquarters to Bellevue. American Pacific owned a whaling station at Bay City on Grays Harbor that operated between 1910 and 1925, processing up to 300 sperm, humpback, and finback whales a year.

Fleet
The fleet included these whale catcher ships:
Aberdeen, built 1912
Moran, built 1911
Paterson, built 1911
Westport, built 1912

References

Sources

History of Washington (state)
Companies based in Bellevue, Washington
Whaling firms
Whaling in the United States
1911 establishments in Washington (state)
History of Grays Harbor County, Washington
American companies established in 1911
Defunct companies based in Seattle
American companies disestablished in 1925
1925 disestablishments in Washington (state)